The Wog Wog River is a perennial river of the Towamba River catchment, located in the South Coast region of New South Wales, Australia.

Course and features
The Wog Wog River rises below White Rock Mountain, south southeast of Bombala and flows generally south southeast, northeast, and then east, joined by two minor tributaries before reaching its confluence with the Towamba River in remote country within South East Forest National Park. The river descends  over its  course.

See also

 Rivers of New South Wales
 List of rivers of New South Wales (L-Z)
 List of rivers of Australia

References

External links
 

Rivers of New South Wales